Hastane - Adliye is an underground station on the M4 line of the Istanbul Metro in Kartal. It is located beneath the D.100 State Highway in the Esenkent neighborhood and is the westernmost metro station in Kartal. Connection to IETT city buses and Istanbul Minibus service is available. The station consists of an island platform with two tracks and was opened on 17 August 2012. It is located next to the Anatolian Palace of Justice.

Station Layout

References

Railway stations opened in 2012
Istanbul metro stations
Kartal
2012 establishments in Turkey